Broadcast Film Critics Association Awards 2004 may refer to:

 9th Critics' Choice Awards, the ninth Critics' Choice Awards ceremony that took place in 2004
 10th Critics' Choice Awards, the tenth Critics' Choice Awards ceremony that took place in 2005 and which honored the best in film for 2004